Dushikou is a town in northern Chicheng County, Hebei province, China, located about  northeast of Zhangjiakou and  north-northwest of the county seat. Dushikou is an ancient town, first built in the Tang Dynasty. It still contains stone paved streets and old buildings. It is located at one of the passes in the Great Wall for which it is named. , it has 12 villages under its administration.

Other names: Tu-shih-k'ou, Tushihkow

See also 
 List of township-level divisions of Hebei

References 

Township-level divisions of Hebei
Zhangjiakou